
 Belagola , sometimes referred to as Mandya Belagola to distinguish it from Shravana Belagola, is a village in the southern state of Karnataka, India. It is located about 15 kilometers north-northwest of Mysuru city in the Shrirangapattana taluk of Mandya district in Karnataka. It is around 7 km from famous K.R.S. dam.

The village has several temple of which two are historically important and close to each other – the Bhaktavatsala temple and the Janardhana temple. The Bhaktavatsala temple is notable for its circular sanctum plan, one among the few such plans seen in South India.

 India census, Belagola had a population of 9216 with 4644 males and 4572 females.

See also
 Mandya
 Districts of Karnataka

References

External links
 http://Mandya.nic.in/

Villages in Mandya district